The Crime and Criminal Tracking Networks and Systems, abbreviated to CCTNS, is a project under the Indian government for creating a comprehensive and integrated system for effective policing through e-Governance. The system includes a nationwide online tracking system by integrating more than 14,000 police stations across the country. The project is implemented by National Crime Records Bureau.

History
The concept of CCTNS was first conceived in the year 2008 by the then Home Minister, P. Chidambaram in the aftermath of 2008 Mumbai attacks.  This was then approved by the Cabinet Committee on Economic Affairs (CCEA) in 2009 and was allocated a fund of Rs. 2,000 crore. A pilot phase of the project was launched on 4 January 2013 by the then Home Minister Sushilkumar Shinde.

Functioning
CCTNS aims to integrate all the data and records of crime into a Core Application Software (CAS), which is presently spreading across 28 states and 9 union territories of India. CAS was developed by the Bangalore-based IT firm, Wipro. It needs to integrate different software and platforms followed by different states and to digitize records of those states which have not digitized their police records. The project also involves training of police personnel and setting up of citizen portal to provide services to citizens.

Crime and Criminals Tracking Network and Systems (CCTNS) 
 The Project will interconnect about 15000 Police Stations and additional 5000 offices of supervisory police officers across the country 
 It will digitize data related to FIR registration, investigation, and charge sheets in all police stations.
 It would help in developing a national database of crime and criminals
 The full implementation of the project with all the new components would lead to a central citizen portal having linkages with State-level citizen portals that will provide a number of citizen-friendly services. 
 The total outlay for the project is 2000 crore rupees, and also includes the Operation and Maintenance phase for additional five years up to March 2022.

Interoperable Criminal Justice System (ICJS)

The CCEA also decided to implement Interoperable Criminal Justice System (ICJS) by 2017. It will be done through integrating CCTNS with e-Courts, e-Prisons, Forensics, and Prosecution, which are the key components of the Criminal Justice System. e-prosecution in Delhi has already been launched by the ICJS team.

Implementation of ICJS will ensure 
 Quick data transfer among different pillars of the criminal justice system, which will not only enhance transparency but also reduce processing time.
 Enable National level crime analytics to be published at an increased frequency, which will help the policymakers as well as lawmakers in taking appropriate and timely action.
 Enable pan-India criminal/accused name search in the regional language for improved inter-state tracking of criminal movement.

See also

 Crime reporting and tracking
 Bureau of Police Research and Development (BPRD)
 Call 112
 Criminal record
 Law enforcement in India
 National Crime Records Bureau (NCRB)
 Sex offender registry (SOR)
 United Nations Office on Drugs and Crime (UNODC)
 Other police-related
 Indian Police Foundation and Institute
 Sardar Vallabhbhai Patel National Police Academy

References
316271908979

External links
 NCRB website
 Crime in India 2012 Statistics

Federal law enforcement agencies of India